Live to Lead is a 2022 American documentary series set for streaming on Netflix. It was released on December 31, 2022.

Background and production 
The series will feature interviews with world leaders and influencers, including Ruth Bader Ginsburg, Greta Thunberg, Bryan Stevenson, Jacinda Ardern, Siya Kolisi, Gloria Steinem, and Albie Sachs. Geoff Blackwell will serve as the series' director. The idea behind the series was conceived by Blackwell and Ruth Hobday as they worked on a project about Nelson Mandela in 2018. Titled I Know This to Be True, the project is a collaboration between Nelson Mandela Foundation and Blackwell & Ruth and involves a series of interviews with leaders and public figures that were released in 2020 as a series of books. In a statement, Blackwell said that the series aimed "to honor Mandela's values by surfacing the stories of leaders who distinguish themselves through their moral courage, the conviction of their ideals and values, and their prioritization of others."

After the first trailer for the documentary was released, New Zealand prime minister Jacinda Ardern stated that she was not in direct contact with the Duke and Duchess of Sussex about the project, and the footage they were using had come from a November 2019 interview with the Nelson Mandela Foundation that was originally meant to be used for "printed and digital books, short films and audiobooks." In March 2021, Ardern was notified that the foundation would use the footage for a Netflix project and in May 2022 she was told that Prince Harry and Meghan would be presenting it, though all communications were through the foundation and Ardern was not in direct contact with the couple regarding the project.

Episodes

References

External links
 

2022 American television series debuts
2022 American television series endings
2020s American television miniseries
2020s American documentary television series
English-language Netflix original programming
Netflix original documentary television series
Meghan, Duchess of Sussex
Prince Harry, Duke of Sussex
Jacinda Ardern
Ruth Bader Ginsburg
Greta Thunberg